Fred Edwords, born July 19, 1948, in San Diego, California, is a longtime agnostic or ignostic humanist leader in Washington DC.

He served as director of planned giving for the Humanist Foundation, the endowment fund of the American Humanist Association, from August 2014 to June 2018, the latter an organization he earlier served as editor of its national magazine, the Humanist, from 1995 to 2006, as executive director from 1984 to 1999, and as national administrator from 1980 to 1984. He was also editor of the association's membership newsletter Free Mind from 2002 to 2006 and editor of the Creation/Evolution journal from 1980 to 1991.

Edwords was national director of the United Coalition of Reason from 2009 to 2015, president of Camp Quest, Inc., from 2002 to 2005, and on the staff of the Ohio camp from 1998 to 2008. He was also vice president of the North American Committee for Humanism from 1990 to 1992 and president of the Humanist Association of San Diego in 1978. He has served on the boards of the International Humanist and Ethical Union (1986–1999), the New York Council for Evolution Education (1982–1994), and the National Center for Science Education (1982–1992). He was chair of the American Humanist Association's Humanist Manifesto III Drafting Committee from 2002 to 2003. On August 7, 1985, he became a co-plaintiff in the successful U.S. District Court lawsuit, Asimov v. United States, against the U.S. Department of Education, brought by the National Emergency Civil Liberties Committee re: magnet schools in the Math/Science bill. He is currently one of the plaintiffs in a case that started in 2014 as American Humanist Association et al v. Maryland-National Capital Park and Planning Commission, a federal lawsuit on appeal to the U.S. Supreme Court that is aimed at removing a 40 foot tall Latin cross on public property in Bladensburg, Maryland.

Edwords was named Rationalist of the Year by the American Rationalist Federation in 1984, received the Humanist Pioneer Award of the American Humanist Association in 1986, was named a HumCon Pioneer by the Alliance of Humanist, Atheist, and Ethical Culture Organizations of Los Angeles County in 1992., and received the Humanist Heritage Award of the Humanist Foundation in 2014.

Edwords has also served on the adjunct faculty of the Humanist Institute, is a Humanist Celebrant Emeritus with the Humanist Society, and served from 2010 through 2018 on the Human Origins Initiative's Broader Social Impacts Committee at the Smithsonian National Museum of Natural History. He is widely published, has been quoted frequently in news stories, and has lectured throughout the United States and Canada as well as in India, Mexico, and Russia.

He has been married to Mary Carroll Murchison-Edwords since June 1980. The couple have two children, both now adults.

See also
 American Humanist Association
 Camp Quest
 United Coalition of Reason

References

External links
 Creation/Evolution journal online 1980-1996 (full run)
 "What Is Humanism?" by Fred Edwords

American humanists
American nonprofit executives
American agnostics
People from San Diego
1948 births
Living people
Activists from California